Ben Reade (born 27 March 1991) is a former speedway rider from England.

Speedway career
He rode in the top tier of British Speedway riding for the Belle Vue Aces during the 2014 Elite League speedway season. He started his speedway career in England riding for the Plymouth Devils in 2014.

References 

1991 births
Living people
British speedway riders
Belle Vue Aces riders
Plymouth Devils riders